The Ougri Hangen or the Ougri Hangken, also known as the Leiroi Nongloi Esei, is a Meitei cultural ritual song with various appellations of the sun and the mythology of creation. It is often sung in the conclusion of the Lai Haraoba festival. Its theme is closely associated with the creation myth of the earth itself. It is also regarded as the song of thanksgiving to the Almighty God. It is always sung in the chorus formed by the male singers with the maiba as the precentor and is strongly enjoined that the chains of the singers forming a circle should never be snapped. It is also known for its incantatory power, for with the alteration of a few lines, it is believed to have been able to cause either prosperity or destruction of the kingdom and the people. Many rulers performed by themselves the rites of singing it with an accompanying dance on the occasion of their conquests or coronation. According to the manuscript "Laisra Pham", a treatise on administration and social conduct, "Ougri" is referred to as being sung at the coronation of Nongta Lailen Pakhangpa in 33 AD. The Naothingkhong Phambal Kaba mentions it as being taught by the sage Luwawg king to the Meitei prince as a part of the Meitei lore, which according to the chronicle Cheitharol Kumbaba, took place just prior to 663 AD.
In some cases, it is also referred to as the actual war songs of the Meitei people.
It is regarded as one of the greatest works of early Meitei literature

External links

References 

Sanamahism
Meitei literature
Meitei culture
Meitei music
Pages with unreviewed translations